The 2009 season was the San Diego Chargers' 40th in the National Football League (NFL) and their 50th since becoming founding members of the American Football League. The Chargers improved upon their regular season record of 8–8 in 2008 and won their division for the fourth straight year and fifth time in six seasons. They finished the regular season with a 13–3 record, the second best winning percentage in franchise history but were upset in the Divisional Playoffs by the New York Jets. It was also Norv Turner's best regular season record as head coach. Also, this was the end of an era as future Hall of Fame running back LaDainian Tomlinson joined the New York Jets following the season, ending his 9-year tenure as a Charger. As of 2021, this represents the most recent AFC West title for the Los Angeles/San Diego Chargers.

2009 NFL Draft

Many have speculated as to who the Chargers are likely to target early in the 2009 NFL Draft. Commonly noted areas of need include the safety positions, the right side of the offensive line, and inside linebacker. The Chargers are also expected to be in the hunt for a running back to eventually replace Tomlinson, who despite past excellence has faced more frequent injuries and declining production as he ages.

Staff

Final roster

Schedule

Preseason

Regular season

Note: Intra-division opponents are in bold text.

Standings

Regular season results

Week 1: at Oakland Raiders

The Chargers began their season at Oakland–Alameda County Coliseum for a Week 1 AFL Legacy duel with their AFC West rival, the Oakland Raiders, in the second game of an MNF doubleheader. In the first quarter, San Diego trailed early as Raiders running back Michael Bush got a 4-yard touchdown run. The Chargers would strike back in the second quarter as running back LaDainian Tomlinson got a 1-yard touchdown run. Oakland would respond with kicker Sebastian Janikowski getting a 37-yard field goal. San Diego would close out the half with kicker Nate Kaeding making a 47-yard field goal.

After a scoreless third quarter, the Raiders would retake the lead in the fourth quarter as Janikowski nailed a 35-yard field goal. The Chargers would take the lead as quarterback Philip Rivers completed a 15-yard touchdown pass to wide receiver Vincent Jackson. Oakland would respond with quarterback JaMarcus Russell completing a 57-yard touchdown pass to wide receiver Louis Murphy, but San Diego came right back with a 5-yard touchdown run by running back Darren Sproles.

With the win, the Chargers began their season at 1–0.

Week 2: vs. Baltimore Ravens

Coming off their road win over the Raiders, the Chargers would play their Week 2 home opener against the Baltimore Ravens. San Diego would deliver the opening strike in the first quarter as quarterback Philip Rivers completed an 81-yard touchdown pass to running back Darren Sproles. The Ravens would respond with running back Willis McGahee getting a 5-yard touchdown run, yet the Chargers would regain the lead as kicker Nate Kaeding got a 29-yard field goal. Baltimore would take the lead in the second quarter as McGahee got a 3-yard touchdown run. San Diego would pull within one as Kaeding made a 22-yard field goal, but the Ravens answered with quarterback Joe Flacco completing a 27-yard touchdown pass to wide receiver Kelley Washington. The Chargers would end the half as Kaeding would make a 23-yard field goal.

In the third quarter, Baltimore would add onto their lead as Flacco completed a 9-yard touchdown pass to tight end Todd Heap. San Diego would stay close as Rivers completed a 35-yard touchdown pass to wide receiver Vincent Jackson. In the fourth quarter, the Chargers got closer as Kaeding kicked a 25-yard field goal, but the Ravens would answer with kicker Steve Hauschka nailing a 33-yard field goal. San Diego would manage to get a late drive all the way to the Ravens' 15-yard line, but on 4th-&-2, Sproles was tackled behind the line of scrimmage by an unblocked Ray Lewis, ending any hope of a comeback.

With the loss, the Chargers fell to 1–1.

Week 3: vs. Miami Dolphins

Hoping to rebound from their tough loss to the Ravens, the Chargers stayed at home for a Week 3 duel with the Miami Dolphins. After a 1-yard fumble recovery for a touchdown by the Dolphins, San Diego would strike in the second quarter with a 25-yard field goal from kicker Nate Kaeding. The Dolphins would answer with a 24-yard field goal from kicker Dan Carpenter. In the third quarter, Miami extended the lead with Carpenter's 23-yard field goal. Afterwards, the Chargers struck back with quarterback Philip Rivers' 5-yard touchdown run. San Diego would then pull away in the fourth quarter with Kaeding nailing a 23-yard and a 26-yard field goal, followed by safety Eric Weddle returning an interception 31 yards for a touchdown. The Dolphins tried to rally with running back Ricky Williams' 14-yard touchdown run, yet the 'Bolts would hold on for the victory.

With the win, the Chargers improved to 2–1.

Week 4: at Pittsburgh Steelers

Coming off their home win over the Dolphins, the Chargers flew to Heinz Field for a Week 4 Sunday night duel with the defending Super Bowl champion Pittsburgh Steelers. San Diego found themselves in a huge deficit in the first half. In the first quarter, the Steelers opened the game with running back Rashard Mendenhall getting a 1-yard touchdown run and quarterback Ben Roethlisberger completing a 19-yard touchdown pass to running back Mewelde Moore. Pittsburgh would increase their lead in the second quarter with Mendenhall's 2-yard touchdown run.

In the third quarter, the Steelers continued to roll as Roethlisberger found tight end Heath Miller on a 6-yard touchdown pass. San Diego would strike back as quarterback Philip Rivers threw a 3-yard touchdown pass to tight end Antonio Gates. In the fourth quarter, the Chargers began to catch up with a key play on special teams as fullback Jacob Hester stripped Stefan Logan of the ball and returned it 41 yards for a touchdown. Pittsburgh would answer with Roethlisberger's 6-yard touchdown pass to Miller. Afterwards, San Diego continued its comeback run as Rivers completed a 30-yard touchdown pass to Gates and a 13-yard touchdown pass to wide receiver Chris Chambers. However, the Steelers came right back with a 46-yard field goal from kicker Jeff Reed. The Bolts tried to cap off their rally, but a sack and fumble by linebacker James Harrison led to a Pittsburgh recovery, effectively ending any hope of a comeback.

With the loss, the Chargers fell to 2–2.

Week 5: BYE

Week 6: vs. Denver Broncos

Coming off their bye week, the Chargers went home, donned their throwback uniforms, and played a Week 6 AFL Legacy duel with the Denver Broncos on Monday night. In the first quarter, San Diego struck first with kicker Nate Kaeding getting a 20-yard field goal. The Broncos would immediately respond as wide receiver Eddie Royal returned a kickoff 93 yards for a touchdown, yet the Chargers came back with quarterback Philip Rivers completing a 3-yard touchdown pass to wide receiver Vincent Jackson. Denver would take the lead in the second quarter with a 34-yard field goal from kicker Matt Prater and Royal returning a punt 71 yards for a touchdown. Afterwards, San Diego closed out the half with a Kaeding 44-yard field goal and running back Darren Sproles' 77-yard punt return for a touchdown.

In the third quarter, the Chargers would add onto their lead with Kaeding nailing a 50-yard field goal. However, the Broncos would take the lead with quarterback Kyle Orton's 19-yard touchdown pass to tight end Tony Scheffler. In the fourth quarter, Denver would increase their lead with Prater's 29-yard field goal and Orton finding wide receiver Brandon Stokley on a 5-yard touchdown pass. San Diego tried to rally, but the Broncos' defense stood strong and held for the win.

With the loss, the Chargers fell to 2–3. This is also their third straight season where the team has started 2–3 after five games.

Week 7: at Kansas City Chiefs

Hoping to rebound from their home loss to the Broncos, the Chargers flew to Arrowhead Stadium, donned their throwbacks, and played a Week 7 AFL Legacy game with the Kansas City Chiefs. In the first quarter, San Diego struck first with quarterback Philip Rivers competing a 3-yard touchdown pass to wide receiver Malcom Floyd and a 10-yard touchdown pass to wide receiver Vincent Jackson. The Chargers would continue their dominance in the second quarter as kicker Nate Kaeding nailed a 20-yard and a 39-yard field goal.

The Chiefs would get on the board in the third quarter with quarterback Matt Cassel completing a 7-yard touchdown pass to wide receiver Dwayne Bowe, yet San Diego came right back with Rivers hooking up with running back Darren Sproles on a 58-yard touchdown pass. Afterwards, the Chargers would wrap up the game in the fourth quarter with Kaeding booting a 19-yard field goal and fullback Jacob Hester recovering a blocked punt in the end zone for a touchdown.

With the win, San Diego improved to 3–3.

Week 8: vs. Oakland Raiders

Coming off their road win over the Chiefs, the Chargers went home, donned their alternate uniforms, and played a Week 8 divisional rematch with the Oakland Raiders. In the first quarter, San Diego struck first as running back LaDainian Tomlinson got a 6-yard touchdown run. The Raiders would answer in the second quarter with a 3-yard touchdown run by running back Justin Fargas, yet the Chargers stormed on as quarterback Philip Rivers hooked up wide receiver Vincent Jackson on an 8-yard touchdown pass, followed by Tomlinson getting a 10-yard touchdown run. Oakland would close out the half with a 48-yard field goal by kicker Sebastian Janikowski.

In the second half, the Raiders would slowly try to rally as Janikowski nailed a 41-yard field goal in the third quarter and a 41-yard field goal in the fourth. Afterwards, San Diego pulled away as kicker Nate Kaeding booted a 28-yard field goal.

With their 13th-straight win over Oakland, the Chargers improved to 4–3.

Week 9: at New York Giants

Coming off their divisional home win over the Raiders, the Chargers flew to Giants Stadium for a Week 9 interconference duel with the New York Giants in the much-hyped first-ever meeting between quarterbacks Philip Rivers & Eli Manning (Drew Brees started for the Chargers when the teams met in 2005).

After a scoreless first quarter, San Diego would deliver the opening strike of the second quarter as Rivers completed a 10-yard touchdown pass to wide receiver Vincent Jackson. The Giants would answer with Manning completing a 6-yard touchdown pass to wide receiver Steve Smith. In the third quarter, the Chargers regained the lead as Rivers found tight end Kris Wilson on a 1-yard touchdown pass. New York would take the lead in the fourth quarter as kicker Lawrence Tynes nailed a 38-yard field goal, Manning hooked up with tight end Kevin Boss on an 8-yard touchdown pass, and Tynes booted a 22-yard field goal. San Diego came right back as Rivers threw the game-winning 18-yard touchdown pass to Jackson.

With the win, the Chargers improved to 5–3 and kept their winning streak going by 3 games.

Week 10: vs. Philadelphia Eagles

Coming off their road win against the Giants, the Chargers went home for an interconference Duel with the Philadelphia Eagles. In the first quarter, the Chargers took the early lead as quarterback Philip Rivers got a 20-yard touchdown pass to fullback Mike Tolbert. In the second quarter, San Diego increased their lead as running back LaDainian Tomlinson got a 3-yard touchdown run. The Eagles would close out the half as David Akers kicked an 18-yard field goal and a 25-yard field goal.

In the third quarter, San Diego increased their lead as Tomlinson made a 20-yard touchdown run. Philadelphia tried to come back as Akers nailed another 25-yard field goal, but the Chargers increased their lead even further as Rivers hooked up with wide receiver Legedu Naanee on a 20-yard touchdown pass. For the fourth quarter, the Eagles tried to close the margin as quarterback Donovan McNabb passed to wide receiver Jeremy Maclin on a 5-yard touchdown pass, followed by a 6-yard touchdown pass to tight end Brent Celek, yet the Chargers hung on for the victory when kicker Nate Kaeding got a 29-yard field goal.

With the win, the Chargers improved to 6–3 and their winning streak to 4 games.

LaDainian Tomlinson (24 carries, 96 yards, 2 TDs) would surpass Marcus Allen for third place in the NFL's All-Time career touchdown leaders with 146.

Week 11: at Denver Broncos

Coming off their win against the Eagles, the Chargers flew to Invesco Field at Mile High for an AFC West rivalry rematch against the Denver Broncos.

In the first half, the Chargers got off to a great start when QB Philip Rivers got a 2-yard touchdown pass to WR Legedu Naanee. Then kicker Nate Kaeding hit a 28 and a 47-yard field goal. In the third quarter the Broncos scored their only points of the game when kicker Matt Prater got a 23-yard field goal, yet the Chargers replied and started to rally with RB LaDainian Tomlinson getting a 1-yard touchdown run, and in the fourth quarter Kaeding making a 28 then a 19-yard field goal, and finally FB Mike Tolbert ran 8 yards to the end zone for a touchdown (With PAT kick blocked).

With the impressive win, the Chargers improve to 7–3

Week 12: vs. Kansas City Chiefs

Looking to increase their win streak, the Chargers went home for an AFC West rivalry rematch against the Kansas City Chiefs. In the first quarter the Chargers took control as QB Philip Rivers got a 19-yard touchdown pass to TE Antonio Gates. The Chiefs would reply to tie the game with QB Matt Cassel making a 7-yard touchdown pass to WR Chris Chambers, until San Diego rallied with RB LaDainian Tomlinson getting a 1-yard touchdown run, then Rivers hooking up with Gates again on a 15-yard touchdown pass, then DB Paul Oliver returned a fumble 40 yards for a touchdown.

In the third quarter the Chargers dominance continued as RB LaDainian Tomlinson got a 3-yard touchdown run. The Chiefs tried to come back with RB Jamaal Charles getting a 2-yard touchdown run, but the Chargers would pull away with kicker Nate Kaeding making a 55-yard field goal. In the fourth quarter a penalty on Matt Cassel was enforced in the end zone for a safety, giving the Chargers 2 points. The final score was made when Kaeding booted a 23-yard field goal.

With the win, the Chargers improve to 8–3.

Week 13: at Cleveland Browns

LaDainian Tomlinson had a game he would not soon forget. He passed Jim Brown, who happened to be sitting up in a suite. When Tomlinson passed him in the all-time rushing list, which made him number eight of all time rushers, he saluted the retired running back.

With the win, the Chargers improved to 9–3, and expanded their winning streak to seven games.

Week 14: at Dallas Cowboys

San Diego came in with a 15–0 December record dated to 2005. San Diego gave up a field goal, then went on a 10-point streak. At the end of the third quarter, Dallas tied the game 10–10. Then the chargers piled up 10 more points, eating up the clock. By the time Dallas struck back, it was too late.

With the win, the Chargers increased their win streak to 8, and had a 10–3 record.

Week 15: vs. Cincinnati Bengals

The Chargers took a 14–13 lead in the first half. During halftime, a piece was shown about the life of the Bengals' wide receiver Chris Henry. The Chargers were up in the fourth quarter 24–13 before the Bengals scored a TD with a 2-point conversion and a field goal tying the game. The Chargers won in the end with a 52-yard field goal by Nate Kaeding.

The close win put the Chargers at 11–3. It marked their 9th straight win and 17th straight win in December. With this win and a 20–19 loss by Denver to Oakland, the Chargers clinched the AFC West.

Week 16: at Tennessee Titans

The Chargers came into the game looking to clinch the AFC's No. 2 seed and a first round bye on Christmas Day in Tennessee.

The Titans struck first with a Rob Bironas 46-yard field goal. Then 2 touchdown passes and a LT TD run put them up 21–10 at halftime. After the break the Chargers continued their demolition of the Titans with three straight TD runs. The game's final score was 42–17.

With the win, the Chargers improved to 12–3, grabbed a first round bye and the No. 2 seed along with their 10th straight win.

Week 17: vs. Washington Redskins

With the win, the Chargers finished the season with an 11-game winning streak and with a record of 13–3 and also were the only team in the AFC West to sweep the whole NFC East.

Post-season results

AFC Divisional Game: vs. New York Jets

Entering the playoffs as the AFC's No. 2 seed, the Chargers began their playoff run at home in the AFC Divisional Round against the No. 5 New York Jets. After a scoreless first quarter, San Diego delivered the game's first strike in the second quarter as quarterback Philip Rivers found tight end Kris Wilson on a 13-yard touchdown pass. The Jets would respond in the third quarter with a 46-yard field goal from kicker Jay Feely. Philip Rivers threw two interceptions and the San Diego Chargers offense failed to get one first down as the Jets defense controlled the third quarter. Then, New York would take the lead in the fourth quarter as quarterback Mark Sanchez completed a 2-yard touchdown pass to tight end Dustin Keller, followed by a 53-yard touchdown run from running back Shonn Greene. The Chargers unsuccessfully tried to rally as struggling quarterback Philip Rivers got a 1-yard touchdown run. However, the Chargers failed to recover the onside kick giving the Jets the ball at the Chargers 28-yard line. The Chargers held the Jets to a 4th and 1 yard to go situation, but the Jets ran the ball converting the first down and kneeled the ball to end the game, finishing the Chargers' season. During the game, Chargers All Pro kicker Nate Kaeding missed field goals from 36, 57 and 40 yards.

External links
Team schedule on NFL.com
2009 San Diego Chargers season at Pro Football Reference
2009 San Diego Chargers season at ESPN

San Diego
San Diego Chargers seasons
AFC West championship seasons
San Diego